Harald Nils Hedjerson (1 April 1913 – 13 January 1966) was a Swedish skier. He competed in the Nordic combined event at the 1936 Winter Olympics.

Hedjerson was also the first Swedish alpine skiing and slalom champion.

His father was the 1910, and very first, Swedish nordic skiing, 30 kilometer, champion, Adolf Hedjerson (1881 – 1961). His son, Hans Hedjerson, born 1943, was one of the best Swedish amateur golfers during the 1960s and early 1970s and professional golfer since 1977.

References

External links
 

1913 births
1966 deaths
Swedish male Nordic combined skiers
Olympic Nordic combined skiers of Sweden
Nordic combined skiers at the 1936 Winter Olympics
Sportspeople from Stockholm